COURTS Malaysia, is a consumer electronics and furniture retailer in Malaysia with a network of 45 stores nationwide and a staff strength of 1,100. Courts has been operating in Malaysia for 34 years.

History

Incorporated on 23 July 1986 as a private limited company under the name Courts Furnishers (Malaysia) Sdn. Bhd, Courts changed its name to Courts Sdn Bhd on 30 June 1997. Courts subsequently converted into a public company and assumed its present name, Courts Sdn Bhd on 1 July 1997. Courts was listed on the Main Board of the Kuala Lumpur Stock Exchange (now known as Bursa Malaysia Securities Berhad) on October 11, 2000, and delisted again from bursa Malaysia 3 September 2007 markets following the completion of ownership engagement with Malaysia Retail Group. Courts is now located in Singapore, Malaysia, and Indonesia.

Re-branding 

Courts has been undergoing various stages of a re-branding initiatives since 2006. Phase 1 of the reformatting of its urban stores adopting the ‘refreshed’ look and feel with an expanded product range in contemporary furnishing and in electronics.

Courts entered Phase 2 of its re-branding with the launch of Courts Megastore in December 2007. Phase 2, also includes the refurbishment of the rest of the Courts outlets scheduled to be completed in March 2009.

Courts Megastore
Courts Malaysia opened its first 'Big-Box' Megastore in Malaysia in the early second half of 2013. It is located at the ground and first floor of the 8trium building in Sri Damansara. This 108,000 sq ft store is the ultimate one-stop lifestyle destination built on a retail proposition to provide choice, value, experience, service and payment options of credit, cash or credit card to consumers.

The concept of launching Courts Megastore targets the urban consumer's evolving tastes and needs as well as appealing to a broader market which may not be aware of Courts. Courts Megastore offers many first-in-Malaysia concepts such as Hot off the Docks, Countdown Corner, Dr. Digital, Sleep Clinic, made-to-order and many more.

2015 saw the re-launched of Courts online alongside the nationwide brand campaign “Senang Sehaja, Courts Ada” where local comedian Harith Iskander was appointed the first Courts brand ambassador in 20 years. Agency created the campaign was DVG Web Sdn Bhd.

2017, COURTS celebrated their 30 Years Anniversary in Malaysia. Singer Liyana Fizi was featured in their music video titled Konfetti. Harith Iskander was also featured on the store's promotions.

2019, Japanese electronics retailer Nojima Corp launched a conditional takeover bid for Courts Asia.

The deal is conditional upon COURTS Asia's majority owner Singapore Retail Group (SRG) agreeing to the deal. Offering 20.5 cents a share for the business, the offer represents a 35 per cent premium over the price shares were trading at before the bid was revealed.

Nojima is listed on the Tokyo Stock Exchange. Like, Courts Asia, it is an electrical appliance retailer, boasting more than 8000 employees and a market capitalisation of S$1.4 billion. Sales in the year to March 31 last year were $6.1 billion.

References

External links
 Courts Malaysia Official website
 Courts Singapore Official website

Retail companies established in 1986
Furniture retailers